A Wrinkle in Time  is a 1962 science fantasy novel by Madeleine L'Engle.

A Wrinkle in Time may also refer to:

 A Wrinkle in Time (2003 film), an American television film based on the novel
 A Wrinkle in Time (2018 film), an American feature film based on the novel
 A Wrinkle in Time (soundtrack), a soundtrack album from the 2018 film